Suitcase Magazine is a multimedia travel magazine, first published in 2012 by Serena Guen. The magazine is available as a quarterly print magazine, iPad and iPhone app, and a daily updated travel website.

Each quarterly print volume includes global travel destinations by theme such as, rhythm, myths & legends, and art, and includes travel stories, city guides and fashion editorials.

Founder and CEO
Serena Guen founded Suitcase Magazine during her final year at New York University.

Book
Cook For Syria: Recipe Book. Suitcase, 2016. Curated by Clerkenwell Boy. Edited by Serena Guen. .
Bake for Syria. Suitcase, 2018. Curated by Clerkenwell Boy. Edited by Serena Guen. ISBN 978-1527221963.

Awards
Magazine of The Year and Travel Magazine of The Year, Digital Magazine Awards 2016
Travel Writer of the Year, Association of Independent Tour Operators for staff writers and contributors Emily Ames, Guen, Maria Alafouzou and Hannah McKeand
Nominated, best website, Awwwards
Winner, Best Art Direction, Buenos Aires International Fashion Film Festival for The Getaway, a video starring Suki Waterhouse and Poppy Jamie
Winner, Flight Centre's Best Travel Publication, Travel Blog Awards 2017.

See also
Monocle (UK magazine)
Condé Nast Traveler
Refinery29
Travel + Leisure

References

Lifestyle magazines published in the United Kingdom
English-language magazines
Magazines published in London
Magazines established in 2013
Tourism magazines